Daur Nachkebia is a writer from Abkhazia and a former Minister for Education, from 20 October 2011 until 15 October 2014, in the Government of President Ankvab. Following the election of President Raul Khajimba in 2014, Nachkebia was not re-appointed.

References

Ministers for Education of Abkhazia
Abkhazian writers
Living people
Year of birth missing (living people)
Place of birth missing (living people)